The Henry Dunant Medal is the highest award of the Red Cross Movement. It is named after Henry Dunant, the founder of the Red Cross Movement. The medal is presented every two years by the Standing Commission of the Red Cross and Red Crescent. This body represents the International Committee of the Red Cross, the International Federation of Red Cross and Red Crescent Societies and the various National Red Cross and Red Crescent Societies.

History
In 1963, the idea of creating a medal named in honour of the founder of the International Red Cross was submitted to and approved by the Council of Delegates. This coincided with the 100th anniversary of the Red Cross. In 1965, through the generosity of the Australian Red Cross, the Henry Dunant Medal was established by the International Red Cross Conference in Vienna. The first medals were presented in 1969.

Criteria
The Henry Dunant Medal is awarded by the Standing Commission of the Red Cross and Red Crescent. This body, representing all of the groups making up the Red Cross Movement, makes five awards of the medal every two years. These limits are placed to ensure the value and prestige of the medal as the highest honour the Red Cross Movement can bestow upon one of its members.

The medal is awarded to, "recognise and reward outstanding services and acts of great devotion, mainly of international significance, to the cause of the Red Cross/Red Crescent by any of its members". The Standing Commission gives special weight to the international significance of the a potential recipients' acts or service. If the international dimension is lacking, the Commission would likely not select the individual concerned. Though their acts of service may be great, but would likely best be recognized by their National Society.

Regulations still allow for the posthumous award of the medal. However, the various groups of the movement have been encouraged to create other means of recognition for those killed in service to the Red Cross. All posthumous nominations for the Henry Dunant Medal should be for, "truly exceptional cases."

Description
The Henry Dunant Medal is in the shape of a Geneva or Greek cross. The arms of the cross are colored with red enamel. In the center of the cross is a circular bronze medallion bearing effigy of Henry Dunant, facing left. Circumscribed around the effigy are the words HENRY DUNANT 1828-1910. The reverse of the medal is plain. To the top arm of the cross is attached a loop for ribbon suspension.

The ribbon is depicted as either solid green, or green with red edges.

Recipients
Pierre Tacier, 1969. First living recipient of the medal, former ICRC Delegate. 
John MacAulay, 1973. Chairman of the International Federation of Red Cross and Red Crescent Societies from 1959 to 1965, first Canadian recipient.
Sai Aung Hlaing Myint, 1977. A member of Myanmar Red Cross Society, for saving a soldier whose car fell into the Ayeyarwady River which was icy cold at that time .
Dr. Abdul Aziz Mudarris, 1983. Established the Saudi Red Crescent in 1962, he was the first President of the Saudi Red Crescent
Joseph Adefarasin, 1987. Former President of the Red Cross League, first Nigerian recipient.
 J. Edwin Lloyd, 19xx, Liberian clergyman, former president of the Liberian National Red Cross Society (1986-1989)
Dr. Ahmad Abu Goura, 1993. President of the Jordanian Red Crescent Society from 1964 to 1993.
Phlech Phiroun, 2001. Former President of the Cambodian Red Cross.
Roger Durand, 2001. Founder and president of the Henry Dunant Society and former Vice-president of the Geneva Red Cross. 
Monique Basque, 2003. Former President of the Red Cross of Côte d'Ivoire 
Frits Kalshoven, 2003. Legal scholar and a specialist in International Humanitarian Law
André Durand, 2003. Former ICRC field delegate and author of a history of the ICRC and the Movement
Noreen Minogue, 2003. Former deputy Secretary General of the Australian Red Cross and promoter of International Humanitarian Law
In 2005, the volunteers and staff of the Red Cross Societies of the four countries most severely affected by the devastating tsunami of 26 December 2004—India, Indonesia, Sri Lanka and Thailand
General Bjørn Egge, 2005. Former President of the Norwegian Red Cross.
Princess Christina, Mrs. Magnuson, 2005. Former President of the Swedish Red Cross and member of the Standing Commission of the Red Cross and Red Crescent
Colonel Dr. Mekonnen Muluneh, 2005. Of the Ethiopian Red Cross Society.
Dr. Jean Pictet, 2005 (posthumously). Main architect of the Geneva Conventions of 1949 and former Vice-President of the International Committee of the Red Cross (ICRC).
James Joseph Carlton, 2007. Former secretary general of the Australian Red Cross and Australian Minister of Health from 1982 to 1983.
Christoph Hensch, 2007. Former ICRC delegate and survivor of the attack on the Red Cross hospital in the Chechen town of Novye Atagi, in 1996.
Alexander Dumba Ika, 2007. Former head of the Congolese Red Cross tracing service in Ituri and head of the ICRC delegation in Bunia.
Josiane Gabel, 2007. Former French Red Cross delegate in Congo and in Chad and National First Aid Director of the Red Cross of Chad 
Datuk Datin Paduka Ruby Lee, 2009. Former Malaysian Red Crescent Society secretary-general. 
Shimelis Adugna, 2011. Former president of the Ethiopian Red Cross and former minister of labour and social affairs of Ethiopia.
Astrid Nøklebye Heiberg, 2011. Former president of the Norwegian Red Cross and former president of the International Federation of Red Cross and Red Crescent Societies.
Barges Hamoud Al-Barges, 2013. Founding member and former president of the Kuwait Red Crescent Society.
Alberto Cairo, 2013. A member of the Italian Red Cross, he has worked in Afghanistan continuously since 1990 (except for a short mission in Sarajevo in 1993), running a network of orthopedic centers since 1994.
Tom Buruku, 2013. Former chairman of the Uganda Red Cross Society and a founding member of the New Partnership for African Red Cross and Red Crescent Societies (NEPARC).
Doña Meneca de Mencía, 2013. Former president of the Honduran Red Cross and former chair of the Inter-American Regional Committee.

References

External links

 List of winners

Medals of the International Red Cross and Red Crescent Movement
Henry Dunant
Awards established in 1969
Humanitarian and service awards